The Greco Defence (or McConnell Defence), named after Gioachino Greco (c. 1600 – c. 1634), is a chess opening that begins with the moves:

1. e4 e5
2. Nf3 Qf6

The opening is categorised by Encyclopaedia of Chess Openings as code C40.

Discussion
Of the several plausible ways Black has to defend his e-pawn, 2...Qf6 is considered one of the weaker choices, since the queen is  prematurely and can become a target for attack. Also, the black knight on g8 is deprived of its most natural square. There is, however, no obvious refutation of this opening; White's advantage consists mainly of smoother development.

Although it is a popular opening choice by novice players, it has also been used by players who, according to International Master Gary Lane, "should know better".

Examples

Greco line
Greco himself illustrated the following amusing line against this defence in 1620:
  
1. e4 e5 2. Nf3 Qf6 3. Bc4 Qg6 4. 0-0 Qxe4 5. Bxf7+ Ke7 
5...Kxf7 6.Ng5+ wins the black queen.

6. Re1 Qf4 7. Rxe5+ Kxf7
7...Kd8 8.Re8

8. d4 Qf6 9. Ng5+ Kg6 10. Qd3+ Kh6 11. Nf7#

McConnell game

Morphy vs. McConnell, New Orleans 1849:
  
1. e4 e5 2. Nf3 Qf6 3. Nc3 c6 4. d4 exd4 5. e5 Qg6 6. Bd3
6.Qxd4 gives White a big lead in development.

6... Qxg2 7. Rg1 Qh3 8. Rg3 Qh5 9. Rg5 Qh3 10. Bf1 Qe6 11. Nxd4 (diagram) 
... and Morphy was better.

Busch game
Paulsen vs. Busch, Düsseldorf 1863:
 
1. e4 e5 2. Nf3 Qf6 3. Bc4 Nh6
Making some sense, since Black is able to respond ...Qxh6 if White were to play d4 followed by Bxh6.

4. 0-0 Bc5 5. Nc3 c6 6. d4! Bxd4 7. Nxd4 exd4 8. e5 Qg6 9. Qxd4
And again, White is ahead in development.

See also
 Greco Countergambit
 List of chess openings
 List of chess openings named after people

References

Chess openings

de:Unregelmäßige Eröffnungen mit e4#Greco-Verteidigung
pl:Obrona Greco